Wayne England (d. 9 February 2016) was an English artist whose work regularly appeared in role-playing games, wargaming rulebooks and magazines and was used on cards for collectible card games such as Magic: The Gathering.

He died on 9 February 2016. Fellow Magic: The Gathering artist Christopher Rush died a day later.

Works
England produced interior illustrations for Games Workshop since Realms of Chaos books, many Dungeons & Dragons books, and did the cover for Lords of Madness (2005). He also produced artwork for other games such as The Wheel of Time Roleplaying Game (Wizards of the Coast) and Warhammer Fantasy Roleplay (Hogshead Publishing and Black Industries), as well as for White Dwarf magazine.

He illustrated at least 108 different cards for the Magic: The Gathering collectible card game.

Of them, some of his most famous works for Magic: The Gathering include: 
 Cryptic Command – Lorwyn
 Ghostly Prison – Planechase 2012
 Goblin Trenches – Apocalypse
 Stony Silence – Innistrad
 Phantom Nantuko – Judgment
 Oblivion Ring – Lorwyn
 Very Cryptic Command – Unstable

References

External links

2016 deaths
British illustrators
Role-playing game artists
Year of birth missing